Guy de Laval may refer to:

 Guy V de Laval (–1210)

 Guy XIII de Laval (1385–1414)
 Guy XIV de Laval (1406–1486)

 Guy XVI de Laval (1476 - 1531)

 Guy XX de Laval (1585–1605) 

 Or one of the other heads of the House of Laval